Jan Benda (born 28 April 1972) is a Belgian-born German ice hockey coach and retired player. He appeared in a total of nine National Hockey League games for the Washington Capitals and participated in three Olympic Winter Games with the German national team.

Career 
Born in Belgium to Czech parents, Benda started his career in the OHL with the Oshawa Generals, where he played with future NHL stars such as Eric Lindros, Jason Arnott, and Stephane Yelle. In his final year with the Generals, he would finish with 35 points in 61 games. After playing 2 seasons in Germany, Benda would return to North America for the 1994-95 ECHL season to play for the Richmond Renegades. He would finish the season with 60 points in 62 games, which ranked fifth on the team that season. That season, he also briefly played for Binghamton Rangers, the AHL affiliate of the New York Rangers. The next two seasons, Benda would play for HC Sparta Praha.

Benda would later return to North America for the 1997-98 season, where he was assigned to the Washington Capitals AHL affiliate, the Portland Pirates. He was later recalled to play for the Capitals, where he would score three assists in nine games. Upon completion of the 1997-98 season, Benda would return to Europe. He would play the next three seasons in SM-Liiga, where he would lead his team in points during the 1998-99 season (with Ässät Pori) and in 1999-2000 (with Jokerit). Benda would leave SM-Liiga in 2001 to sign with Ak Bars Kazan of the Russian Superleague. He would spend the next three seasons in Kazan and would split his final year between Khimik Voskresensk and Cherepovets Severstal.

Benda played in the Czech Republic for BK Mladá Boleslav, whom he joined in 2008 where he was the captain. Before joining BK Mladá Boleslav, he had played with HC Litvínov from 2006-08.

Benda has represented Germany at the 2002 World Championships, the 1996 World Cup of Hockey, and the Winter Olympics in 1994, 1998, and 2002.

Benda played for HC Plzeň 1929 and scored 35 points in 51 regular season games during the 2009-10 season.

In 2011, he returned to Germany, joining the Nürnberg Ice Tigers of the Deutsche Eishockey Liga on a short-term deal, before signing with EHC München for the remainder of the 2011-12 season.

He then spent the 2012-13 campaign with the Dresdner Eislöwen in Germany's second-tier league DEL2.

The 2014-15 season saw Benda score 10 goals and dish 29 assists in 42 games for Deggendorf Fire in the German Oberliga. For the 2015-16 season, he moved to ECDC Memmingen, a member of the Bayernliga in Germany. Along with his playing duties he served as a coach in the club's youth program. When ECDC head coach Alexander Wedl was sacked in January 2016, Benda took over head coaching duties on an interim basis. His playing career ended in June 2018 at age 46.

Following his playing days, Benda worked for ECDC Memmingen as an assistant coach and youth coach.

Career statistics

Regular season and playoffs

International

References

External links
 

1972 births
Living people
Ak Bars Kazan players
Ässät players
Binghamton Rangers players
Deggendorfer SC players
EHC Freiburg players
Expatriate ice hockey players in Russia
German expatriate sportspeople in the Czech Republic
German expatriate sportspeople in Russia
German expatriate sportspeople in Canada
German expatriate sportspeople in the United States
German expatriate ice hockey people
German ice hockey centres
German people of Czech descent
HC Khimik Voskresensk players
HC Litvínov players
HC Plzeň players
HC Slavia Praha players
HC Sparta Praha players
PSG Berani Zlín players
Eishockey-Bundesliga players
Ice hockey players at the 1994 Winter Olympics
Ice hockey players at the 1998 Winter Olympics
Ice hockey players at the 2002 Winter Olympics
Jokerit players
Olympic ice hockey players of Germany
Oshawa Generals players
People from Rumst
Portland Pirates players
Richmond Renegades players
Severstal Cherepovets players
Undrafted National Hockey League players
Washington Capitals players
West German ice hockey centres
West German expatriate sportspeople in Canada
Expatriate ice hockey players in Canada
Expatriate ice hockey players in the United States
Expatriate ice hockey players in the Czech Republic
Expatriate ice hockey players in Finland
German ice hockey coaches
BK Mladá Boleslav players
Dresdner Eislöwen players
EHC München players
Nürnberg Ice Tigers players